The 10th South Indian International Movie Awards is an awards event that took place at Bengaluru, India on 10–11 September 2022. The ceremony (10th SIIMA) recognized and honored the best films and performances from the Telugu, Tamil, Malayalam and Kannada films and music released in 2021, along with special honors for lifetime contributions and few special awards.

The event was announced officially in early-August along with the date. On 17 August 2022, nominations for the Best Film category were announced along with the other categories. The first day of the ceremony (10 September 2022) awarded the best films and performances from the Telugu and Kannada cinema, whereas on the second day, best films and performances from the Tamil and Malayalam cinema were awarded.

Dhananjaya is nominated in three categories, the highest in a single year. He has become the first person to be nominated in three main acting categories, that is, Best Actor in a Leading Role – Kannada, Best Actor in a Supporting Role – Kannada and Best Actor in a Negative Role – Kannada. Pushpa: The Rise won eight awards from 12 nominations, thus becoming the most awarded and most nominated film of the year.

Main awards

Film

Acting

Debut awards

Music

Critics' choice awards 
Telugu cinema

 Best Actor – Naveen Polishetty – Jathi Ratnalu
 Best Actor – Pooja Hegde – Most Eligible Bachelor

Tamil cinema

 Best Actor – Arya – Sarpatta Parambarai
 Best Actor – Aishwarya Rajesh – Thittam Irandu

Kannada cinema

 Best Actress – Amrutha Iyengar – Badava Rascal

Malayalam cinema

 Best Actor – Biju Menon – Aarkkariyam
 Best Actor – Nimisha Sajayan – The Great Indian Kitchen

Special awards 
 Special Jury Award for Best Production Design –  S. Rama Krishna and Monika Niggotre S. – Pushpa: The Rise, Uppena and Thalaivii
 Most Promising Newcomer (Male) – Teja Sajja – Zombie Reddy
 Most Promising Newcomer (Female) – Sreeleela – Pelli SandaD
 Youth Icon South (Male) – Vijay Deverakonda
 Youth Icon South (Female) – Pooja Hegde
 Most Popular Hindi actor in South India – Ranveer Singh
 Special Appreciation Movie – Omkaar Movies – Kannadiga
 Sensation of Kannada cinema – Dhananjaya
 Original Pan Indian Superstar – Kamal Haasan
 Outstanding Performance of the Year – Yogi Babu – Mandela
 Decade of Excellence in South Indian Cinema – Hansika Motwani
 Entertainer of the Year (Male) – Nandamuri Balakrishna – Akhanda
 Entertainer of the Year (Female) – Sai Pallavi – Love Story and Shyam Singha Roy

Superlatives

Presenters and performers

Notes

References

External links 

South Indian International Movie Awards
2022 Indian film awards